Falkenbach is a viking metal group from Germany that is signed to Prophecy Productions. The name means "Falconbrook" in German.

They are one of the first viking metal bands, starting in 1989, with their first release that same year. The one permanent member is Vratyas Vakyas (real name Markus Tümmers) who was born in Germany, but lived in Iceland in the late 1980s.

History
Falkenbach was one of Germany's first examples of what would be labeled pagan metal. The band was formed in Iceland in 1989, when it recorded the Hávamál demo, and has recorded a total of seven demos; however, only five are known. Three more were released by 1995: Skínn af sverði sól valtíva (Old Norse, "The Sun Shines on the Swords of Slaughter-Gods"), Læknishendr (Old Norse, "Healing Hands"), and Ásynja (Old Norse, "Goddess"). Of all of these except Læknishendr, only nine copies were released.

In 1995, recording of the debut album Fireblade began, but due to equipment troubles, production was stopped shortly before mixing began. Fireblade was not released, and in December of the same year, recording began for ...En their medh ríki fara... (Old Norse, "...And in Glory Will They Go..."). The recording for this actual debut album was completed in March 1996. The album cover features a part of an illustration of the Wild Hunt, made by Friedrich Wilhelm Heine for Wilhelm Wägner's Nordisch-germanische Götter und Helden (1882). With this Falkenbach placed itself within a tradition that connects metal music to the Wild Hunt motif, present since Bathory's album Blood Fire Death (1988).

After ...Magni blandinn ok megintiri... (Old Norse, "Mixed with Strength and Pride Glory") was released, Vratyas stopped recording music so he could focus more on his record label Skaldic Art Productions.

In 2003, Vratyas returned to the studio with three other musicians and close friends to record Ok nefna tysvar Ty (Old Norse, "And Name Twice Týr"). The next Falkenbach album, Heralding – The Fireblade, was recorded in August–September 2005, using the same session musicians he had used for Ok Nefna Tysvar Ty. It includes material originally intended for the never released Fireblade album and re-working of demo tracks.

In 2006 Skaldic Arts Productions released a tribute album called An Homage to Falkenbach. It consists of two parts, each limited to 500 units. The work contains 16 covers by various bands such as Eluveitie, Folkearth, and Bewitched.

Vratyas Vakyas (whose name roughly translates to "the searching wanderer"), the sole member of Falkenbach, lives in Düsseldorf, Germany.

Style and lyrical themes
The Hávamál demo is allegedly clean folk music, but since then the sound has become more raw and influenced by black metal influence and matured into an epic metal sound.

Most of Falkenbach lyrics are in English. They also write lyrics in Old Norse, Latin, and Old German. Most, if not all of the lyrics in Old Norse are actually taken from heathen literature: for example, the chorus lines in the song "Donar's Oak" are actually verses four and five of Grímnismál, a poem of the Elder Edda. (Hávamál, after which the first demo is named, is another such poem.)

According to Vratyas, one thing that sets Falkenbach apart from a band such Bathory is that his music is underpinned by a pagan religiosity. Vratyas defines his approach to paganism as animistic, through which it rejects the existence of a frontier between a person and the outer world.

Discography
Studio albums
 ...En their medh ríki fara... (1996)
 ...Magni blandinn ok megintiri... (1998)
 Ok nefna tysvar Ty (2003)
 Heralding – The Fireblade (2005)
 Tiurida (2011)
 Asa (2013)

Demos
 Hávamál (1989)
 Tanfana (1990)
 Towards Solens Golden Light (1991)
 Promo '95 (1995)
 Laeknishendr (1995)
 ...Skínn af sverði sól valtíva... (1996)

Line-up

Current members

Vratyas Vakyas - guitar, acoustic guitar, keyboards, drums, vocals

Session members

 Hagalaz - guitars on Ok nefna tysvar Ty, Heralding - The Fireblade and Tiurida.
 Tyrann - vocals on Ok nefna tysvar Ty, Heralding - The Fireblade and Tiurida.
 Boltthorn - drums on Ok nefna tysvar Ty, Heralding - The Fireblade and Tiurida.
 Albion - bass on Tiurida.

See also 
 Neopagan music

References

External links
 
 

Viking metal musical groups
German black metal musical groups
Musical groups established in 1989
German folk metal musical groups
Napalm Records artists
One-man bands
Modern pagan musical groups
Modern paganism in Germany